"Wait A Minute" is a song performed by American singer Ray J, which served as the lead single from his second studio album This Ain't a Game (2001). The song features guest vocals from then-Atlantic labelmate Lil' Kim, and production by duo the Neptunes; member Pharrell Williams performs its chorus. Ray J's first single since "Let It Go" (1997) to reach the top 40 of the Billboard charts, the song peaked at number 30 and reached number 8 on the Hot R&B/Hip-Hop Songs chart. It also scored moderate success overseas, particularly in the UK, with a number 54 placement on the UK Singles Chart. The single appeared on the charts in Germany and Switzerland.

A music video for the single directed by Billie Woodruff, featured cameo appearances by Jackie Long, Pharrell Williams and Ray J's sister Brandy and was released in June 2001, and received heavy rotation on music channels such as BET.

Charts

Weekly charts

Year-end charts

References

2001 singles
Ray J songs
Lil' Kim songs
Music videos directed by Bille Woodruff
Song recordings produced by the Neptunes
2000 songs
Atlantic Records singles
Songs written by Chad Hugo
Songs written by Pharrell Williams
Songs written by Ray J